This is a list of documentary films produced in Albania during the 1950s.

Documentary films
 Festa e çlirimit të Shqipërisë (1950)
 Miqësi e pathyeshme (1951)
 Për paktin e paqes (1951)
 Shatërvani i Bahçisarajt (1951)
 Festivali Folkloristik 1952 (1952)
 Kongresi i dytë i PPSH (1952)
 Rrugë e lavdishme (1952)
 Shqipëria (1952)
 Takim i përzemërt (1952)
 Betimit i popullit shqiptar para Stalinit të madh (1953)
 Festa e ushtrisë popullore (1953)
 10 Vjetori i lavdishëm (1954)
 E kaluara nuk kthehet më (1954)
 Miq të dashur (1954)
 Mysafirë nga Shqipëria (1954)
 Letër nga fshati (1955)
 Në festivalin e Varshavës (1955)
 Pushime të gëzuara! (1955)
 Urime shokë studentë! (1955)
 Zëri i popullit shqiptar (1955)
 Alpinistët në Korab (1956)
 Cërriku (1956)
 Delegacioni ynë qeveritar në RP të Mongolisë (1956)
 Kino koncert i këngëve dhe valleve (1956)
 Kongresi i partisë sonë (1956)
 Luftëtarë të 5 vjeçarit (1956)
 Mysafirë të shtrenjtë (1956)
 Nëntori ynë (1956)
 Nga punimet e Kongresit të XX të PK të BS (1956)
 Përgatitja rreshtore (1956)
 Pranvera e nëntë (1956)
 Riatdhesimi i ushtarëve grekë të strehuar në Shqipëri (1956)
 Shprehje e miqësisë së pathyeshme (1956)
 Si bëhen votimet (1956)

References

Lists of Albanian films